Dámóc is a village in Borsod-Abaúj-Zemplén County in northeastern Hungary.  it had a population of 407. The town is home to a Hungarian Greek Catholic Church, founded in 1735, and built between 1816 and 1832 in Baroque Revival style.

References

Populated places in Borsod-Abaúj-Zemplén County